The 1949 CCNY Beavers football team was an American football team that represented the City College of New York (CCNY) as an independent during the 1949 college football season. In their first season under Frank Tubridy, the Beavers team compiled a 2–5–1 record.

Schedule

References

CCNY
CCNY Beavers football seasons
CCNY Beavers football